Richard Leonard (Rick) Miller (born 12 January 1961, Reseda, California) is a former American international motorcycle speedway rider, and an automotive and motorcycle stuntman. Miller won two national BMX titles as a Webco-sponsored rider in his early teens. Miller then rode motocross in the southern California area before switching to Speedway.

Career
Miller started his speedway career in 1981, became pro the next year and won rookie of the year. Speedway credits for 1982 include the Ventura track championship and the US Open National Championship in Owego, New York.

In 1986 he won the inaugural West End Speedway International at the Wayville Showground in Adelaide, South Australia. He would come back a year later and finish third at Wayville behind 1986 World Champion Hans Nielsen and Tommy Knudsen (both from Denmark).

Miller was also a frequent member of the USA speedway team in the World Team Cup, finishing 3rd in 1983 in Vojens, Denmark, 2nd in the 3 round 1986 series, 3rd in the 1987 series held again over 3 rounds, 2nd in 1988 at the Veterans Memorial Stadium in Long Beach, 4th in 1989 at the Odsal Stadium in Bradford, England, before finally becoming a World Champion by winning the 1990 Speedway World Team Cup in Pardubice, Czechoslovakia alongside Kelly Moran, Sam Ermolenko, Shawn Moran and Billy Hamill. Miller's last appearance in the World Team Cup Final was in 1991 in Vojens, helping Team USA to 3rd place where he scored 4 points as the team reserve.

Rick Miller rode in two Individual World Finals during his career. His first World Final appearance came at the Odsal Stadium in 1990 where he finished in 9th place with 7 points from his 5 rides. His second and last World Final came in 1992 at the Olympic Stadium in Wrocław, Poland where he finished a disappointing 11th after scoring 6 points.

Miller rode in the UK for the Coventry Bees from 1982-1992, and was honoured with a testimonial in 1992. The Bees won two league titles in 1987 and 1988, going undefeated in the 1987 season, a feat never done before or since. Miller also rode for the Örnarna Eagles in Mariestad, Sweden, and helped them in winning the 1992 Elitserien Championship. He also rode for Polish 2nd Division club Polonia Bydgoszcz.

Miller retired from speedway at the end of the 1992 season and started a new career as a stuntman.

Miller was stunt double for Ryan Gosling in The Place Beyond the Pines, and has worked as a stuntman in over fifty feature films.

World Final appearances

Individual World Championship
 1990 -  Bradford, Odsal Stadium - 9th - 7pts
 1992 -  Wrocław, Olympic Stadium - 11th - 6pts

World Team Cup
 1983 -  Vojens, Speedway Center - 3rd - 27pts (0 - Reserve)
 1986 -  Vojens, Speedway Center and  Bradford, Odsal Stadium (with Bobby Schwartz / Sam Ermolenko / Lance King / Shawn Moran)  - 2nd - 76pts (2)
 1987 -  Fredericia, Fredericia Speedway,  Coventry, Brandon Stadium and  Prague, Marketa Stadium (with Shawn Moran / Sam Ermolenko / Lance King / Kelly Moran / John Cook)  - 3rd - 93pts (22)
 1988 -  Long Beach, Veterans Memorial Stadium (with Sam Ermolenko / Lance King / Shawn Moran / Kelly Moran) - 2nd - 32pts (0)
 1989 -  Bradford, Odsal Stadium (with Kelly Moran / Greg Hancock / Ronnie Correy / Lance King) - 4th - 8pts (0)
 1990 -  Pardubice, Svítkov Stadion - Winner - 37pts (0)
 1991 -  Vojens, Speedway Center - 3rd - 28pts (4 - Reserve)

References

1961 births
Living people
American speedway riders
People from Reseda, Los Angeles
Polonia Bydgoszcz riders
Coventry Bees riders
American stunt performers
Expatriate speedway riders in Poland
American expatriate sportspeople in Poland